('Suffrage for Women') is a journal published by the Swedish National Association for Women's Suffrage. It was first published in 1912 and the last issue was published in 1919, when the Riksdag (Swedish Parliament) decided to extend universal suffrage to men and women. The journal's motto was: "We can never do as much for a great cause as a great cause can do for us."

History 

The National Association for Women's Suffrage (LKPR) had been using the Fredrika Bremer Association's journal Dagny som as a mouthpiece. Cooperation between the two could be problematic at times; LKPR was against the fact that the editors of Dagny also allowed opponents of suffrage to publish in the journal.

Its first editor was Elisabeth Krey-Lange. After that,  was editor of the magazine from 1913 to 1914 and editor in chief from 1913 to 1919. Most of the most prominent figures in the Swedish women's movement contributed articles, including Gulli Petrini, Anna Lindhagen, Ellen Key, Lydia Wahlström, Elsa Collin, Karolina Widerström, Anna Bugge-Wicksell, and Signe Bergman.

Eight years after the journal's launch, in May 1919, Parliament voted to extend the right to vote to women. The June 1919 issue was devoted entirely to suffrage reform and women's new role as citizens. The last issue of the journal was published in December 1919.

References

Notes

Sources

External links 

 All issues of Rösträtt för kvinnor in PDF format 

Publications established in 1912
Publications disestablished in 1919
Feminism in Sweden
Women's suffrage in Sweden